The Great Gale of 1880 was an intense extratropical cyclone (possibly deeper than 955 millibars (mb) or 28.20") that impacted the Northwest United States on January 9, 1880. Gusts of an estimated 138 miles per hour hit the northwest coast. Buildings, barns, and fences were destroyed. The storm blew a three-masted schooner onto the beach at Coos Bay where it broke in two.

Newspaper reports and anecdotes 
On January 19, 1880, a letter to The Daily Oregonian from an Astoria resident reads,
From the graphic, and, in some cases, the heart-rending accounts published in the Oregonian descriptive of the disasters resulting from the late severe windstorms in other portions of the state and the neighboring territory, it would appear that our town and county suffered less injury than almost any other.

Parts of the lower Columbia seem to have experienced a blizzard, as related from Westport:
On the 9th at 2 o-clock P.M., a storm of snow and wind set in and continued for two hours with all the fury of a hurricane.

As documented in the Morning Oregonian, Polk County reported "the heaviest wind storm ever known in these parts" and the Dallas Itemizer said "The storm of Friday was considered very severe here at that time, but since the reports of the havoc in other places, we have concluded that we had no storm here to speak of."

An article printed on January 12, 1880 noted,
The storm near the mouth of the Columbia seems to have been entirely distinct from the one which swept through the Willamette Valley, and scarcely as severe or prolonged. The wind was from the northwest, and did not commence to blow violently until nearly 2 o'clock Friday afternoon.

In the Fort Clatsop area along the Lewis and Clark River, it was reported 
The wind changed suddenly to the west, and while the trees were heavily laden with snow, struck the forest with terrific effect.

In contrast to the north coast, a letter from Newport printed in The Oregonian on January 17, 1880 reported
We have just experienced one of the severest gales; nothing like it has occurred since the settlement of the bay. It was southeast, lasted about five hours, and was terrible in force…  The tide rose seven feet higher than was ever known; nearly all the old wharves are taken away.

There was no snowfall on the coastal hills around Newport, but "several miles from here it is five inches, and gradually deepens as you go east. Said to be 18 inches deep at Siletz, Oregon." Further south, it was reported on January 19 that Gardiner was struck with a "perfect gale" that threw large breakers ashore and shoved water into a warehouse, threatening livestock. "The rain came down in torrents," and the Umpqua River and Smith River flooded high, adding to the wet mess. "The storm raged with great violence at Coos Bay." The three-masted schooner Emma Utter dragged anchor and was smashed ashore. 

The powerful gale struck much of the Willamette Valley in the mid to late morning. For example, "the heaviest windstorm ever known in these parts" struck Monmouth, in Polk County, at about 11 AM. The strong winds also struck the city of Corvallis at 11 AM, with the gale lasting until about 3 PM, and started around 9 AM in Blodgett in the coast range to the west. In Portland, the powerful wind began at 11 AM, and lasted until about 2:30 PM.

See also

Extratropical cyclone
Windstorm
Columbus Day Storm of 1962
Hanukkah Eve windstorm of 2006
Great Coastal Gale of 2007
2011 Bering Sea superstorm
November 2014 Bering Sea cyclone
SS Alpena lost in October 1880
List of storms on the Great Lakes

References

External links
The January 9, 1880 "Storm King"

1880 meteorology
Natural disasters in Oregon
1880 natural disasters
Pacific Northwest storms
Weather events in the United States
1880 natural disasters in the United States
January 1880 events